The Pioverna is a torrente (a stream whose flow is subject to a high level of seasonal variation) of Lombardy in northern Italy. The stream is born in the Grigna massif and flows north and west through the Valsassina, forming a gorge at Bellano before entering Lake Como. The entire course of the stream falls within the Province of Lecco

The torrent, home to brown trout, rainbow trout and European bullhead, is a favourite of anglers.

Rivers of Italy
Rivers of Lombardy
Rivers of the Province of Lecco
Valsassina